Merdeka Tournament or Pestabola Merdeka is a friendly football tournament held in Malaysia to commemorate the Independence Day and mainly played at Stadium Merdeka, Kuala Lumpur. The competition bears the Malay word for independence. The Merdeka Tournament was once regarded as the 'Grand Old Lady of Asia' where top teams from football playing nations would love an invitation to the tournament. As of 2022, it has been held 40 times, and decreasingly in recent decades. Matches in Merdeka tournament considered International "A" matches (Friendly match) by FIFA.

History 

The Pestabola Merdeka is Asia`s oldest football tournament which invited football playing nations to compete since 1957. The Merdeka tournament also was once called the ‘Mini Asia Cup’ around the 1960s to 1980s, which was founded by the former AFC President, Tunku Abdul Rahman. While the tournament had been held annually from 1957 to 1988, it has been held only nine times from 1989 to 2013. During the late 1950s to early 1980s, it was a prestigious tournament among Asian nations because the participants sent their full senior players. After the 1980s, interest in the cup waned from both football fans and football teams, because many Asian nations focused more on the qualification phases in FIFA World Cup and AFC Asian Cup.

The first edition of the Pestabola Merdeka was held in August and September 1957 with Hong Kong emerging inaugural champions. However, from then on it was purely dominated by Malaysia, South Korea, Myanmar, Indonesia and a host of other countries, including South American and European clubs.

Malaysia/Malaya exclusively lifted the trophy ten times, emerged runners-up on eight occasions, and in addition shared the winner’s rostrum twice with South Korea (1960 and 1979), while South Korean sides have won it seven times.

Indonesia, Taiwan and Myanmar hold multi-winning accolades. The other champions were Morocco (1980), New Zealand (2000), Uzbekistan (2001), Czechoslovakia Olympic (1987) and Austria’s with their SK Admira Wacker (1991), German Hamburger SV (1988), Argentinian Buenos Aires XI (1983) and Brazilian Santa Catarina XI (1982).

Brazilian states' Sao Paulo XI, Minas Gerais XI, and America FC Rio de Janeiro finished runners-up, as have Japan and India.

Champions 
Below are the list of champions in Pestabola Merdeka competitions since 1957.

Note: 1 All teams participant fielded their strongest side and their match are regarded
as full internationals for their association.                                                                                                                                                                                        2 South Korea was represented by a reserve team with some senior players.

Teams' achievements 
Below are the record of teams in Pestabola Merdeka competitions (1957–present).

Goalscorers

Overall top scorers

Notable players 
Here are some prominent footballers, who participated in this competition.

 Mokhtar Dahari
 Soh Chin Ann
 Abdul Ghani Minhat
 P. K. Banerjee
 Chuni Goswami
 Kim Jae-han
 Cha Bum-kun
 Lee Woon-jae
 Kunishige Kamamoto
 Yasuhiko Okudera
 Abdul Kadir
 Suk Bahadur
 Hussein Saeed
 Abedi Pele
 Jakob Kjeldbjerg
 Jacob Laursen
 Ryan Nelsen

Notes

References 

 
International association football competitions hosted by Malaysia
Recurring sporting events established in 1957
Recurring sporting events disestablished in 2013
1957 establishments in Malaya
2013 disestablishments in Malaysia